Jenny Byrne and Janine Tremelling won in the final 7–5, 6–7, 6–4 against Elise Burgin and Rosalyn Fairbank.

Seeds
Champion seeds are indicated in bold text while text in italics indicates the round in which those seeds were eliminated.

 Lori McNeil /  Betsy Nagelsen (semifinals)
 Elise Burgin /  Rosalyn Fairbank (final)
 Leila Meskhi /  Svetlana Parkhomenko (first round)
 Beth Herr /  Candy Reynolds (quarterfinals)

Draw

References
 1988 Virginia Slims of Nashville Doubles Draw

Virginia Slims of Nashville
1988 WTA Tour